Photinia prunifolia is a species in the family Rosaceae of flowering plants.

References

prunifolia
Plants described in 1837